Frédéric Petit may refer to:

 Frédéric Petit (astronomer) (1810–1865), first director of the Toulouse Observatory
 Frédéric Petit (19th-century politician) (1836–1895), mayor of Amiens and member of the French Senate representing Somme
 Charles Frédéric Petit (1857–1947), French competitive archer
 Frédéric Petit (21st century politician) (born 1961), member of the French National Assembly for the Seventh constituency for French residents overseas since 2017
 Frédéric Petit (motorcyclist) (born 1975), Grand Prix motorcycle racer